The Brazilian monitor Piauí was the fourth ship of the  river monitors built for the Brazilian Navy during the Paraguayan War in the late 1860s. Piauí passed the fortifications at Humaitá in July 1868 and provided fire support for the army for the rest of the war. The ship was assigned to the Mato Grosso Flotilla after the war. Piauí was scrapped in 1893.

Design and description
The Pará-class monitors were designed to meet the need of the Brazilian Navy for small, shallow-draft armored ships capable of withstanding heavy fire. The monitor configuration was chosen since a turreted design did not have the same problems engaging enemy ships and fortifications as did the central battery ironclads already in Brazilian service. The oblong gun turret sat on a circular platform that had a central pivot. It was rotated by four men via a system of gears; 2.25 minutes were required for a full 360° rotation. A bronze ram was fitted to these ships as well. The hull was sheathed with Muntz metal to reduce biofouling.

With only  of freeboard they had to be towed between Rio de Janeiro and their areas of operations. Their crew numbered 43 officers and men.

Propulsion
The Pará-class ships had two direct-acting steam engines, each driving a single  propeller. The ships carried enough coal for one day's steaming.

Armament
Piauí had a single 120-pounder Whitworth rifled muzzle loader (RML) in her gun turret. Most unusually the gun's Brazilian-designed iron carriage was designed to pivot vertically at the muzzle; this was done to minimize the size of the gunport through which splinters and shells could enter.

Armor
The hull of the Pará-class ships was made from three layers of wood, with the grain of each layer at right angles to the next layer.

The rectangular gun turret had rounded corners. Its roof and the exposed portions of the platform it rested upon were protected by 12.7 millimeters of armor. The armored pilothouse was positioned ahead of the turret.

Service
Piauí was laid down at the Arsenal de Marinha da Côrte in Rio de Janeiro on 8 December 1866, during the Paraguayan War, which saw Argentina and Brazil allied against Paraguay. She was launched on 8 January 1868 and commissioned later that month. She bombarded Asunción that same day. The monitor and a number of Brazilian ironclads bombarded Paraguayan batteries at Angostura, downstream of Asunción, on 28 October, 19 November and 26 November. On 31 August 1869 the monitor unsuccessfully tried to locate and destroy the remnants of the Paraguayan Navy on the Manduvirá River. In the 1880s the ship's armament was reinforced with a pair of  machine guns. After the war she was assigned to the Mato Grosso Flotilla and was scrapped in 1893.

Notes

References

External links
 Brief history of Piauí 

Ships built in Brazil
1868 ships
Pará-class monitors